Robert Marx (born September 25, 1956) is an American épée fencer. He competed at the 1984, 1988 and 1992 Summer Olympics.

See also
List of USFA Division I National Champions

References

External links
 

1956 births
Living people
American male épée fencers
Olympic fencers of the United States
Fencers at the 1984 Summer Olympics
Fencers at the 1988 Summer Olympics
Fencers at the 1992 Summer Olympics
Fencers from Portland, Oregon
Pan American Games medalists in fencing
Pan American Games silver medalists for the United States
Pan American Games bronze medalists for the United States
Fencers at the 1991 Pan American Games
Fencers at the 1987 Pan American Games